Henry Youngblood (May 9, 1879 in Wiota, Wisconsin – February 19, 1960 in Monroe, Wisconsin) was a member of the Wisconsin State Assembly.

Biography
Youngblood was born on May 9, 1879, in Wiota, Wisconsin. He later resided in Woodford, Wisconsin.

Career
Youngblood was a member of the Assembly from 1937 to 1946. Additionally, he was Supervisor of Woodford from 1926 to 1927 and Chairman of Woodford from 1928 to 1933. He was a Republican.

References

1879 births
1960 deaths
Republican Party members of the Wisconsin State Assembly
People from Wiota, Wisconsin